The Story of a Mother (2010) is an Italian short film produced and directed by Alessandro De Vivo and Ivano di Natale.  The drama features  Nino ColellaAngela de Matteo Renato De Rienzo.  It is an adaptation of the Hans Christian Andersen short story of the same name.

Plot
One night, Death (voice of Renato de Rienzo) swoops in and takes the life of a child. His mother (Angela de Matteo) will do anything to recover him, even lose all she has.

Cast
 Nino Colella as Guardian of the Forest
 Angela de Matteo as Mother
 Renato De Rienzo as Death and voice f. c. 
 Valeria Frallicciardi as Woman
 Nunzia Schiano as Greenhouse Keeper

Exhibition
The film opened at the New York City Horror Film Festival on May 5, 2010.

Film Festivals
  New York City Horror Film Festival - 2010
 Hollywood Reel Independent Film Festival - 2010
 Newport Beach Film Festival - 2011
 Minghella Film Festival - 2011
 Boston International Film Festival - 2011
 Fantasy Horror Award - 2011
 Dances With Films - 2011
 I've Seen Films International Film Festival - 2011
 Napoli Film Festival - 2011
 41° Parallelo - New York City - 2011
 Riverside International Film Festival 2012

Source:

Awards
Wins
 Roma Fantafestival, Best Short, 2012
 California Film Awards, Silver Award, 2012

See also
 Hans Christian Andersen
 The Story of a Mother

References

External links
 The Story of a Mother official web site
 
 

2010 films
2010 drama films
Italian drama films
2010s Italian-language films
Films based on works by Hans Christian Andersen
Films shot in Italy
Films based on fairy tales